Charles Carson may refer to:

 Charles C. Carson (1925–2002), American mortician
 Charles C. Carson Center for Mortuary Affairs at Dover Air Force Base
 Charles Frederick Carson, Canadian-born soldier who served with the British Army
 Charles L. Carson (1847–1891), American architect
 Charles Carson (actor) (1885–1977), British actor
 Charles Carson (painter) (born 1957), Canadian painter
Charles Carson, a character from the television series Downton Abbey

See also
 Carson Charles, Trinidad and Tobago politician